Przebendowski Palace is a palace in Warsaw, built in the first half of the 18th century for Jan Jerzy Przebendowski. It is now located between the carriageways of the main road 62 "Solidarności" Avenue (the former address was 14 Bielańska).

History

The palace was built in the Baroque style around 1730, on the ruins of an earlier building for the Crown Treasurer, Jan Jerzy Przebendowski. Its designer was John Sigismund Deybel. After Jan Jerzy Przebendowski's death, the palace was inherited by his daughter Dorothy Henrietta, then by Piotr Jerzy Przebendowski.

After the property was inherited by Ignacy Przebendowski, it was rented from 1760-1762 to palace diplomat and Member of the Spanish Court, Pedro Pablo de Bolea, who started the palace's famous masked balls. Ignatius Przebendowski sold the palace in 1766, to Constance Lubienska of Łubna, and in 1768 all rights were acquired by Constance's husband, the Royal Treasurer Roch Kossowski.

From 1863 to 1912 it belonged to Jan Zawiszy, and after his death, to his wife Elizabeth and daughter Mary. In 1912, it was acquired by the Prince Janusz Radziwiłł, Ordynat of Olyka and owner of Nieborów Palace.

It was destroyed during the Warsaw Uprising, and was taken from Janusz Radziwill in 1947, and rebuilt in 1949, together with a major throughroad. During the People's Republic of Poland it served as the Central Museum to Lenin, opening on April 21, 1955.

Since 1990, the building has housed the office of the Museum of Independence (Muzeum Niepodległości w Warszawie).

From 2000 to 2009, it also functioned as the Cinema Paradiso (Kino Paradiso) - named after the Italian movie of the same name - which was run by distributor Solopan for challenging and non-commercial films of high artistic interest. The projectors were removed during a renovation.

Bibliography
 Anna Saratowicz, Pałac Przebendowskich, Warszaw 1990,  .
 Charles Mórawski Wieslaw Głębocki "Warszawa"-tourist guide, Warsaw 1982, KAW

Houses completed in 1730
Palaces in Warsaw